Picket fence is a type of wooden fence.

Picket fence may also refer to:

 Picket fence (electronics), a shielding structure used in electronics
 Picket Fences, a television series